Ilya Palazkov (born 2 August 1995) is a Belarusian modern pentathlete. He competed in the men's event at the 2020 Summer Olympics.

References

External links
 

1995 births
Living people
Belarusian male modern pentathletes
Modern pentathletes at the 2020 Summer Olympics
Olympic modern pentathletes of Belarus
People from Mogilev
Sportspeople from Mogilev Region
20th-century Belarusian people
21st-century Belarusian people